Memphis Wrestling was an American professional wrestling promotion based in Memphis, Tennessee.

History
Memphis Wrestling evolved from an earlier short-lived promotion called Memphis Championship Wrestling.

In 2019, Dustin & Maria Starr with the help of David Marquez & United Wrestling Network to launch Championship Wrestling From Memphis for WLMT-TV CW30 Memphis

Television
The Memphis Wrestling in-studio television show, Memphis Wrestling: Home of Rhythm and Bruise, was broadcast weekly on WLMT (CW30), the Memphis, Tennessee affiliate of The CW Television Network, and is produced in the WLMT studio. It was originally broadcast every Saturday morning at 11 AM CT, beginning on May 17, 2003. In 2006, due to numerous conflicts with other Saturday morning broadcasting commitments, such as college football, the weekly broadcast moved to 10 PM CT and was renamed Memphis Wrestling Prime Time. The promotion also aired internationally on the Fight Network (UK & Ireland) in Europe until the channel went bankrupt, and on the Fight Network in Canada.

As of January 2008, Memphis Wrestling was running repeats of previously-aired shows.

On August 9, 2008, Memphis Wrestling returned to its 11 AM Saturday spot, now on channel 50.

The company closed down in 2014.

Championships
Memphis Wrestling Light Heavyweight Championship 
Memphis Wrestling Southern Heavyweight Championship
Memphis Wrestling Southern Tag Team Championship 
Memphis Wrestling Southern Television Championship (defunct)

Clash of Legends

See also

Continental Wrestling Association
List of independent wrestling promotions in the United States

References

External links
Yahoo Sports Group
Memphis Wrestling History
Jerry Lawler's Official Website
Memphis Wrestling - Yahoo group

Sports in Memphis, Tennessee
Independent professional wrestling promotions based in Tennessee
2003 establishments in Tennessee